Grand Gorge station, MP 65.5 on the Ulster and Delaware Railroad (U&D), originally known as Moresville, is a train station that had more freight service than passenger service. Its main business was the freight coming from the local farms and dairy products from the Decker-Slawson Creamery, which later became the Sheffield Farms Creamery. It also served the nearby community of Prattsville.

For a time Grand Gorge was the site of great activity when the construction of the Schenectady and Margaretville Railroad was attempted.  Special sidings were built for contractors and a large volume of equipment and supplies were delivered to commence construction.   Hundreds of Italian laborers recruited from New York City were set to work grading the new line.  Unfortunately, the money soon ran out, the workers were not paid and the whole project collapsed.  Many of the laborers walked back to New York City following the tracks on which they had arrived.  Evidence of the grading can still be seen today along the valley from Grand Gorge down to Prattsville.

The original station at Grand Gorge was one of the old board-and-batten Rondout and Oswego stations. However, this station was razed by fire in the 1890s, and was replaced with a more-traditional station. However, this station was abandoned on March 31, 1954, with the end of passenger service on the U&D. It was eventually so deteriorated that the New York Central Railroad tore it down in the late 1950s, in fear that someone could get hurt.

The station was located at the intersection of New York Route 30 and Ferris Hill Road.

References

External links
Ulster and Delaware Railroad Historical Society map

Railway stations in the Catskill Mountains
Former Ulster and Delaware Railroad stations
Railway stations in Delaware County, New York
Former railway stations in New York (state)
Railway stations closed in 1954